Yaakov Yitzhaki  (September 1, 1846 – June 11, 1917) was a rabbi, scholar, religious Zionist and founder of the settlement of Be'er Ya'akov.

Biography
Yaakov Yitzhaki was born in Derbent into a family of Mountain Jews and received his religious education from his father, Rabbi Yitzhak ben Yaakov, and, like his father, at a yeshiva in Bila Tserkva. In 1868, when he was 22 years old, with the consent of the elders of the community, his father appointed him chief rabbi and religious judge of Derbent. Yitzhaki, who spoke Yiddish, studied secular sciences and the Russian language in a realschule. He kept in touch with orientalists, including Abraham Harkavy and Joseph Chorny.

In the 1880s, he was appointed by the tsarist government as crown rabbi of the Mountain Jews of Southern Dagestan and Azerbaijan.

Yitzhaki contacted Jewish communities in Poland, Romania, Lithuania, Turkey, Bukhara, Persia, Kurdistan and Palestine. 
He was interested in literature, Jewish studies, religious studies and archeology. He was a member of the "Higher Education" organization, which wrote and published articles in the Historical Jewish Press: "Hamagid", "Recommended", "Lebanon", "The Collector", and other popular magazines.

He compiled the first Juhuri-Hebrew dictionary and a brief history of the Mountain Jews.

In 1876, Yitzhaki visited the Holy Land for the first time, and in 1887 for the second time. In 1907 he moved there, where he organized a group of immigrants who founded the settlement of Be'er Ya'akov.

During the First World War, Yaakov Yitzhaki suffered from hunger and died of exhaustion in Jerusalem. He was buried on the Mount of Olives.

Archive of Yaakov Yitzhaki
In 1974 Yaakov Yitzhaki's son Yitzhak Yitzhaki transferred the part of his father's archive that he had preserved to the Central Archive of the History of the Jewish People in Jerusalem. The collection has been fully digitized and is available online at the archive's website.

Notes

1846 births
People from Derbent
Mountain Jews
Emigrants from the Russian Empire to the Ottoman Empire
1917 deaths
Burials in Israel
19th-century rabbis from the Russian Empire